Howard I. Wetston  (born June 3, 1947), is a former Canadian Senator and retired public servant and lawyer who was formerly the Chairperson of the Ontario Securities Commission from 2010 to 2015. Prior to the OSC, Wetson was the chair and CEO of the Ontario Energy Board and various other public organizations.

On October 31, 2016, his appointment to the Senate of Canada was announced. Wetston was a member of the Independent Senators Group.

Earlier career
He graduated from Mount Allison University with a Bachelor of Science and later with a Bachelor of Law from Dalhousie Law School. Earlier in his career he was a Crown counsel in Nova Scotia and later worked as a lawyer in private practice in Ottawa and Montreal.

Federal judge
Wetston was a judge of the Federal Court of Canada from 1993 to 1999, and before that was Director of Investigation and Research with the federal Competition Bureau from 1989 to 1993.

Chair of the Ontario Securities Commission
Wetston was appointed  as chair of the OSC in October 2010 to a 3-year term by Ontario Finance Minister Dwight Duncan.
 His term was extended until 2015 when Wetston stepped down.

References

External links

1947 births
Living people
Judges of the Federal Court of Canada
Lawyers in Nova Scotia
Lawyers in Ontario
Prosecutors
Canadian chairpersons of corporations
Chairpersons of non-governmental organizations
Members of the Order of Canada
Canadian King's Counsel
Mount Allison University alumni
Dalhousie University alumni
Canadian senators from Ontario
Independent Canadian senators
Politicians from Montreal
Politicians from Ottawa
Businesspeople from Montreal
Businesspeople from Ottawa
Independent Senators Group
21st-century Canadian politicians
Place of birth missing (living people)